François Bon, born on 22 May 1953 in Luçon, is a French writer and translator.

Work 
François Bon published his first novel in 1982, Sortie d'usine. He then earned a creative residency at the Villa Médicis in 1984, and has since worked in literature, as a writer, translator, performer or publisher. François Bon has written essays, novels, radio programs, poetry as well as theatre or children's literature.

In 2010, he began a series of translations of novels and essays by the American author H.P Lovecraft, for which he created a website, The Lovecraft Monument.

He also works with underprivileged young people in writing workshops. Since 2013, he teaches creative writing at the Ecole Nationale Supérieure d'Arts of Cergy-Pontoise (France).

Contribution to web literature 
In 1997, Bon created one of the first French websites entirely about literature : remue.net, that evolved into tierslivre.net and became his primary creative platform. His interest for literary creation on and for the Internet led him to work on a project about digital photography, tumulte.net, a website that turned into a book, Tumulte, published in 2006.

He has since participated in symposiums and panels, where he has discussed the relationship between literature and technology. He launched an ebook publishing company, Publie.net and has released an essay about the changing nature of the book in the Information Age, Après le livre (2011).

In 2016, Bon created his own publishing house, Tiers Livre Editeurs, which complements his blog's output.

Distinctions 
 1984-1985 : resident at the Villa Médicis.
 1987-1988 : laureate of the Deutscher Akademischer Austauschdienst (Berliner Künstlerprogramm).
 1991 : laureate of the Bosch Fondation (Stuttgart).
 1992 : awarded the Prix Paul Vaillant-Couturier for L'Enterrement.
 1992 : awarded the Prix du livre en Poitou-Charentes for L’Enterrement.
 1993 : awarded the Prix Télérama for Dans la ville invisible.
 2000 : awarded the Prix France Culture / revue Urbanisme "La ville à lire" for Paysage fer.
 2002 : awarded the Prix Louis-Guilloux for Mécanique.
 2002 : awarded the Prix d'automne de la Société des gens de Lettre for Rolling Stones.
 2004 : awarded the Prix Wepler for Daewoo.
 2015 : Mission Stendhal (Lovecraft archives in Providence).

Bibliography

Romans et récits 
 Sortie d'usine, Paris, Minuit, 1982 
 Limite, Paris, Minuit, 1985
 Le Crime de Buzon, Paris, Minuit, 1986
 Décor ciment, Paris, Minuit, 1988
 Calvaire des chiens, Paris, Minuit, 1990
 L'Enterrement, Lagrasse, Verdier, 1991
 Temps machine, Lagrasse, Verdier, 1992
 Un fait divers, Paris, Minuit, 1994
 C'était toute une vie, Lagrasse, Verdier, 1995
 Parking, Paris, Minuit, 1996
 Voleurs de feu - Les vies singulières des poètes, illustrated by François Place, Paris, Hatier, 1996
 Prison, Lagrasse, Verdier, 1997
 Impatience, Paris, Minuit, 1998
 Tous les mots sont adultes, method for writing workshops, Paris, Fayard, 2000 
 Paysage fer, Lagrasse, Verdier, 2000 
 15021, photos of Jérôme Schlomoff, Coaraze, L'Amourier éditions, 2000
 Mécanique, Lagrasse, Verdier, 2001
 Daewoo, Paris, Fayard, 2004 
 Tumulte, Paris, Fayard, 2006
 L'Incendie du Hilton, Paris, Albin Michel, 2009

Children's and youth's literature 
 Dans la ville invisible, Paris, Gallimard Jeunesse, 1993
 30, rue de la Poste, Paris, Seuil Jeunesse, 1996
 Autoroute, Paris, Seuil Jeunesse, 1998

Essays and biographies 
 La Folie Rabelais, Paris, Minuit, 1990
 François Place, illustrateur, Paris, Casterman, 1994 
 Dehors est la ville, essay about Edward Hopper, Paris, Flohic, 1998
 Pour Koltès, Besançon, Solitaires Intempestifs, 2000
 Rolling Stones, une biographie, Paris, Fayard, 2002 
 Bob Dylan, une biographie, Paris, Albin Michel, 2007 
 Rock'n roll, un portrait de Led Zeppelin, Paris, Albin Michel, 2008
 Billancourt, with photos from Antoine Stéphani, Paris, Cercle d'art, 2004
 Petit Palais, with photos from Antoine Stéphani, Paris, Cercle d'art, 2005
 Après le livre, Paris, Seuil, 2011
 Autobiographie des objets, Paris, Seuil, 2012
 Proust est une fiction, Paris, Seuil, 2013
 Fragments du dedans, Paris, Grasset, 2014

Theatre plays 
 Quatre avec le mort, Paris, Verdier, 2002
 Quoi faire de son chien mort, Besançon, Solitaires intempestifs, 2004
 Dialogue avec ta mort, Tiers Livre éditeur, 2016

References

External links
 Tierslivre, his personal web site (in French)
 Le Tumulte
 Critical bibliography (Auteurs.contemporain.info)

1953 births
Living people
People from Luçon
20th-century French novelists
20th-century French male writers
21st-century French novelists
20th-century French dramatists and playwrights
French children's writers
Prix Louis Guilloux winners
French male novelists
English–French translators
21st-century French male writers